Bahadurgarh Fort is a historical fort near Patiala in Punjab, India. 

Constructed on the site of the old Saifabad Fort, which was built as the residence of Nawab Saif ud-Din Mahmud or Saif Khan, the fort was renovated by  Maharaja Karam Singh of the princely state of Patiala in 1837.

Design and architecture 
The fort is built in an area of about 21 sq kilometers in a circular shape surrounded by two ramparts and moat. The fort was built in 1658 and later renovated between 1837 and 1845 in the cost of around  100,000 at that time.

The fort was named after Guru Tegh Bahadur, the ninth Guru of Sikhism, by Maharaja Karam Singh in 1837.

References

External links

Forts in Punjab, India
Buildings and structures completed in 1845
Sikh architecture